Jules Tchimbakala (born 15 January 1971) is a Congolese former professional footballer who played as a left-back.

Tchimbakala spent most of his career playing in the lower levels of French football, primarily with Paris FC. He spent two seasons playing in Ligue 1 with Toulouse FC and two seasons playing in Ligue 2 for Toulouse and Le Mans UC 72. He had a brief spell in Scotland with Raith Rovers without making a first-team appearance for the club.

Tchimbakala made several appearances for the Republic of the Congo national team, including three appearances at the 2000 African Cup of Nations finals.

References

External links

1971 births
Living people
Association football fullbacks
Republic of the Congo footballers
Republic of the Congo international footballers
2000 African Cup of Nations players
Ligue 1 players
Ligue 2 players
Championnat National players
Championnat National 2 players
Paris FC players
Toulouse FC players
Le Mans FC players
Thouars Foot 79 players
Raith Rovers F.C. players
Republic of the Congo expatriate footballers
Republic of the Congo expatriate sportspeople in France
Expatriate footballers in France
Republic of the Congo expatriate sportspeople in Scotland
Expatriate footballers in Scotland